Radstube means something like "wheelhouse" or "wheel room" and is the German mining term for a surface or underground structure designed to house a water wheel in order to drive a flatrod system. 

The fast-developing mining industry in Europe in the Middle Ages led to big increases in the quantities of materials used, mineshafts being sunk to ever increasing depths and, in particular, sharply rising demands on the water management of mines, all of which required suitable sources of power. One option for fulfilling these requirements was hydropower and the construction of water wheels. These were enclosed in buildings, or Radstuben, to protect them from the weather. The name Radstube was later also applied to underground chambers designed to accommodate a water wheel.

The installation of underground Radstuben was particularly difficult and expensive.

Literature 
 Alfred Nehls: Aller Reichtum lag in der Erde. Verlag Gronenberg, Gummersbach, 1993, 

Water management in mining
Water wheels